The  Nike Windpark Laakdal is a wind park containing 6 RePower MD77 wind turbines with a capacity of 1.5 MW each. It is located on the site of the Nike corporation in Laakdal, Belgium. The wind turbines have a rotor diameter of 77 meters and are installed on a 111.5 meter high steel framework. Roads capable of carrying heavy trucks run between the legs of some of these steel towers.

External links 

 http://www.seebaenergyfarming.de/index.php?id=33
 

Buildings and structures in Antwerp Province
Wind farms in Belgium
Laakdal